The 2009–10 New Mexico Lobos men's basketball team represented the University of New Mexico as a member of the Mountain West Conference. The Lobos were coached by third-year head coach Steve Alford and played their home games at The Pit, newly renamed from its previous official name of University Arena, in Albuquerque, New Mexico.

The Lobos finished the season 30–5, 14–2 in Mountain West play to capture the regular season championship. They advanced to the semifinals of the 2010 Mountain West Conference men's basketball tournament before being defeated by eventual champion San Diego State. They received an at–large bid to the 2010 NCAA Division I men's basketball tournament, earning a 3 seed in the East Region. They defeated 14 seed Montana in the first round before being upset by 11 seed Washington in the second round to end their season.

2009–10 University Arena renovations
The University of New Mexico Vice President for Athletics Paul Krebs outlined details of the $60 million renovations to University Arena (The Pit). Krebs stated, "Our goal is to create the best collegiate basketball venue in the nation."

The design process followed the completion of the Program Document for The Pit, which was used to guide the planning and design. The focus of the design, guided by Molzen-Corbin & Associates, was to maintain and improve the fan experience but not change The Pit. The planning committee was charged with keeping The Pit intimate, respecting its history, keeping the mystique of the arena, maintaining great sight lines and the current bowl seating mix and embracing new technology.

The project was expected to be completed in time for the 2010–2011 basketball season. During construction the home games still took place at University Arena and had no impact on the 2009–10 season.

Roster

Rankings

2009–2010 schedule

|-
!colspan=9 style=| Exhibition

|-
!colspan=9 style=| Regular season

|-
!colspan=10 style=| Mountain West tournament

|-
!colspan=10 style=| NCAA tournament

References

New Mexico
New Mexico Lobos men's basketball seasons
New Mexico
2010 in sports in New Mexico
2009 in sports in New Mexico